Half Dome is a granite dome at the eastern end of Yosemite Valley in Yosemite National Park, California. It is a well-known rock formation in the park, named for its distinct shape. One side is a sheer face while the other three sides are smooth and round, making it appear like a dome cut in half.

Geology

The impression from the valley floor that this is a round dome that has lost its northwest half, is just an illusion. From Washburn Point, Half Dome can be seen as a thin ridge of rock, an arête, that is oriented northeast–southwest, with its southeast side almost as steep as its northwest side except for the very top. Although the trend of this ridge, as well as that of Tenaya Canyon, is probably controlled by master joints, 80 percent of the northwest "half" of the original dome may well still be there.

Ascents

As late as the 1870s, Half Dome was described as "perfectly inaccessible" by Josiah Whitney of the California Geological Survey. The summit was finally reached by George G. Anderson in October 1875, via a route constructed by drilling and placing iron eye bolts into the smooth granite.  Anderson had previously tried a variety of methods, including using pitch from nearby pine trees for extra friction.

Anderson subsequently went on to add ropes to his eye bolts, so that other people could climb.  Among those who took advantage was the first woman to climb Half Dome in 1876,  S. L.  Dutcher,  of  San  Francisco.  In 1877 James Mason Hutchings along with Anderson led a climb which included Hutchings' daughter Cosie, his son Willie, his mother-in-law Florence Sproat (aged 65), and two other women.

Today, Half Dome may be ascended in several different ways.  Thousands of hikers reach the top each year by following an  trail from the valley floor.  After a rigorous  approach, including several hundred feet of granite stairs, the final pitch up the peak's steep but somewhat rounded east face is ascended with the aid of a pair of post-mounted steel cables originally constructed close to the Anderson route in 1919.

Alternatively, over a dozen rock climbing routes lead from the valley up Half Dome's vertical northwest face. The first technical ascent was in 1957 via a route pioneered by Royal Robbins, Mike Sherrick, and Jerry Gallwas, today known as the Regular Northwest Face. Their five-day epic was the first Grade VI climb in the United States. Their route has now been free climbed several times in a few hours' time. Other technical routes ascend the south face and the west shoulder.

Hiking the Cable Route
The length and difficulty of the trail used to keep it less crowded than other park trails, but in recent years the trail traffic has grown to as many as 800 people a day. The hike can be done from the valley floor in a single long day, but many people break it up by camping overnight in Little Yosemite Valley. The trail climbs past Vernal Fall and Nevada Fall, then continues into Little Yosemite Valley, then north to the base of the northeast ridge of Half Dome itself.

The final  ascent is steeply up the rock between two steel cables used as handholds. The cables are fixed with bolts in the rock and raised onto a series of metal poles in late May (the poles do not anchor the cables). The cables are taken down from the poles for the winter in early October, but they are still fixed to the rock surface and can be used. The National Park Service recommends against climbing the route when the cables are down or when the surface of the rock is wet and slippery. The Cable Route is rated class 3, while the same face away from the cables is rated class 5.

The Cable Route can be crowded. In past years, as many as 1,000 hikers per day have climbed the dome on a summer weekend, and about 50,000 hikers climb it every year.

Since 2011, all hikers who intend to ascend the Cable Route must now obtain permits before entering the park when the cables are up between May and October. Permits are checked by a ranger on the trail, and no hikers without permits are allowed to hike beyond the base of the sub-dome or to the bottom of the cables. Hikers caught bypassing the rangers to visit either the sub-dome or main dome without a permit face fines of up to $5,000 and/or 6 months in jail.

Backpackers with an appropriate wilderness permit can receive a Half Dome permit when they pick up their wilderness permit with no additional reservation required. Rock climbers who reach the top of Half Dome without entering the subdome area can descend on the Half Dome Trail without a permit.

The top of Half Dome is a large, flat area where climbers can relax and enjoy their accomplishment. The summit offers views of the surrounding areas, including Little Yosemite Valley and the Valley Floor. A notable location to one side of Half Dome is the "Diving Board", where Ansel Adams took his photograph Monolith, the Face of Half Dome on April 10, 1927. Often confused with "the Visor," a small overhanging ledge at the summit, the Diving Board is on the shoulder of Half Dome.

From 1919 when the cables were erected through 2011, there have been seven fatal falls from the cables. The latest fatality occurred on September 5, 2019.

Lightning strikes can be a risk while on or near the summit. On July 27, 1985, five hikers were struck by lightning, resulting in two fatalities.

The Cable Route was added to the National Register of Historic Places in 2012.

Trivia

The ashes of Ansel Adams, whose photographs of the formation are iconic images, were scattered on Half Dome.

Notable ascents

 1875 (October 12) George G. Anderson via drilled spikes on the east slope.
1875 (before November 10) John Muir
 1946 Salathe Route on southwest face (IV 5.7 A3), FA by John Salathe and Anton Nelson
 1957 Northwest Face (VI 5.8 A3), FA by Royal Robbins, Jerry Gallwas and Mike Sherrick. First Grade VI in North America.
 1963 Direct Northwest Face (VI 5.9 A5), FA by Royal Robbins and Dick McCracken
1969 Tis-sa-ack (VI 5.9 A4), FA by Royal Robbins and Don Peterson.
 1973 First "clean ascent" of NW face by Dennis Hennek, Doug Robinson, and Galen Rowell, Hennek is on the cover of June 1974 National Geographic leading a nut protected traverse see Super Topo too

 1987 The Big Chill (VI 5.9 A4), FA by Jim Bridwell, Peter Mayfield, Sean Plunkett and Steve Bosque
 1989 Shadows (VI 5.10 A5), FA by Jim Bridwell, Charles Row, Cito Kirkpatrick, William Westbay
 1989 Kali Yuga (VI 5.10 A4+), FA by John Middendorf, Walt Shipley
 1997 Blue Shift (VI 5.11c a4) FA by Jay Smith and Karl McConachie.

Notable free climbs
 1964 Salathe Route (5.10), FFA by Frank Sacherer, Bob Kamps & Andy Lichtman
 1965 Snake Dike (5.7), FFA by Eric Beck, Jim Bridwell and Chris Fredericks
 1976 Regular Northwest Face, Higbee variation (VI 5.12d) by Art Higbee and Jim Erickson.
 1985 The Autobahn (5.11+/5.12a) by John Middendorf and Charles Cole.

 1988 Southern Belle (V 5.12d) by Dave Schultz and Scott Cosgrove
 2008 Regular Northwest Face, Higbee variation (VI 5.12a, 23 pitches), free solo climb by Alex Honnold.

In culture

Half Dome was originally called "Tis-sa-ack", meaning Cleft Rock in the language of the local Ahwahnechee people. Tis-sa-ack is also the name of the fourth route on the formation, ascended by Royal Robbins and Don Peterson over eight days in October 1969. Tis-sa-ack is the name of a mother from a native legend. The face seen in Half Dome is supposed to be hers. Tis-sa-ack is the name of a Mono Lake Paiute girl in the Yosemite Native American legend. John Muir interchangeably used "Tissiack," "South Dome," and "Half Dome" in his writings.

Others say Ahwahneechee Native Americans named Half Dome "Face of a Young Woman Stained with Tears" ("Tis-se’-yak") because of the colonies of brown-black lichens that form dark vertical drip-like stripes along drainage tracks in the rock faces.

Jack London's 1900 short story "Dutch Courage" tells of a fictional climb of Half Dome.

Half Dome was used as the logo for a software company, Sierra On-Line.

In 1971, outdoor recreation and climbing equipment company The North Face created their company logo, based upon a stylized depiction of the Half Dome formation. It is still their logo 50 years later.

In 1988, Half Dome was featured on a 25 cent United States postage stamp. An image of Half Dome, along with John Muir and the California condor, appears on the California State Quarter, released in January 2005.

From 2010 until the introduction of REAL ID, California driver's licenses featured an illustration of Half Dome.

See also
 El Capitan
 Monolith, the Face of Half Dome, a photograph by Ansel Adams
 Quarter Domes
 Sentinel Dome
 Yosemite National Park

References

External links

 Half Dome Day Hike on the NPS website
 Geologic Story of Yosemite National Park by N. King Huber, USGS (adapted PD source)
 
 Daily updating time-lapse movies of Half Dome
 Monolith, The Face of Half Dome, Ansel Adams
 Moon and Half Dome, Ansel Adams

Geology of Yosemite National Park
Landforms of Yosemite National Park
Mountains of Mariposa County, California
Rock formations of California
Tourist attractions in Mariposa County, California
Domes
Granite domes of Yosemite National Park